Longridge Town Football Club is a football club based in Longridge, Lancashire, England.

History

The club was established in 1996 by a merger of Longridge St Wilfrid's and Longridge United. They started in the Preston & District League and were Centenary Guildhall Cup winners in season 2004-05, promotions saw the club reach the Premier Division, and a second-place finish in 2005–06 led to them joining Division Two of the West Lancashire League in 2008. They finished as runners-up in their first season in the division, earning promotion to Division One. The 2011–12 season saw the club win the Division One title, resulting in promotion to the Premier Division. In 2016–17 they were Premier Division champions. Following a third-place finish the following season, the club moved up to Division One North of the North West Counties League (NWCL). The club's first season in Division One North of the NWCL saw them go on to win the league on the last day of the season ahead of Avro F.C. With becoming league champions, the club was promoted to the NWCL Premier Division at the first attempt, as Jay Hart finished the season with thirty goals.

Staff

Honours
North West Counties Division One North
Division One North champions 2018–19
West Lancashire League
Wilf Carr Trophy 2017–18
Premier Division champions 2017–18
Division One champions 2011–12
Preston & District League
 Centenary Guildhall Cup winners 2004–05
Premier Division runners up 2004–05
Division Three champions 2003–04

References

External links
Official website

 
Football clubs in England
Football clubs in Lancashire
Sport in Ribble Valley
1996 establishments in England
Association football clubs established in 1996
West Lancashire Football League
North West Counties Football League clubs